Manora may refer to:

 Manora, Karachi, in Karachi, Sindh, Pakistan
 Manora, Washim, a taluka in Washim district of Maharashtra, India
 Manora Cantonment, in Karachi, Sindh, Pakistan
 Manora Fort, Karachi, Karachi, Sindh, Pakistan
 Manora Fort, Thanjavur, Thanjavur, India
 Manora Island, an island in Karachi, Sindh, Pakistan
 Manora, the Thai pronunciation of Manohara, a character in Southeast Asian mythology
 Manora, the Thai pronunciation of Menora, a traditional dance of south Thailand and northern Malaysia states

See also 
 Manorah (disambiguation)
 Menora (disambiguation)